Stephan de Freitas Barcha (born 27 October 1989) is a Brazilian Olympic show jumping rider. He competed at the 2016 Summer Olympics in Rio de Janeiro, Brazil, where he finished 5th in the team and 60th in the individual competition

References

Living people
1989 births
Brazilian male equestrians
Equestrians at the 2016 Summer Olympics
Olympic equestrians of Brazil
South American Games gold medalists for Brazil
South American Games silver medalists for Brazil
South American Games medalists in equestrian
Competitors at the 2022 South American Games